Bondurant is a surname. Notable people with the surname include:

 Amy L. Bondurant, former U.S. Ambassador to the OECD
Bob Bondurant (1933-2021), American race car driver
 Bourbon Bondurant, professional football player
 George W. BonDurant, American preacher
 James Bondurant, American race car driver
 Jean Pierre Bondurant dit Cougoussac, a French Huguenot who emigrated from France in 1697 to Switzerland then on to Virginia in 1700 to escape religious persecution after Louis XIV revoked the Edict of Nantes.
 Joan Bondurant, American spy and scholar of nonviolence
 Matt Bondurant, American writer